Howard Wells Fulweiler (September 18, 1885 – April 17, 1936) was an American football player and coach and clergyman. He served as the head football coach at the South Dakota School of Mines in Rapid City, South Dakota in 1911. Fulweiler was a member of the University of Pennsylvania football team from 1905 to 1908. He later served as a pastor in South Dakota and the surrounding region.

References

External links
 

1885 births
1936 deaths
Penn Quakers football players
South Dakota Mines Hardrockers football coaches
Players of American football from Camden, New Jersey
Coaches of American football from New Jersey